Kaarlo Toivo Aronen (4 June 1886 – 1 November 1973) was a Finnish construction worker and politician, born in  Pori. He was in prison from 1918 to 1919 for having sided with the Reds during the Finnish Civil War. He was a member of the Parliament of Finland from 1922 to 1923, representing the Socialist Workers' Party of Finland (SSTP). He was arrested in 1923 on sedition charges and was given a prison sentence. He was freed in 1928.

References

1886 births
1973 deaths
People from Pori
People from Turku and Pori Province (Grand Duchy of Finland)
Socialist Workers Party of Finland politicians
Members of the Parliament of Finland (1922–24)
People of the Finnish Civil War (Red side)
Prisoners and detainees of Finland